Joseph Michael Schenck (December 25, 1876 – October 22, 1961) was a Russian-born American film studio executive.

Life and career
Schenck was born to a Jewish family in Rybinsk, Yaroslavl Oblast, Russian Empire. He emigrated to New York City on July 19, 1892 under the name Ossip Schenker; and with his younger brother Nicholas eventually got into the entertainment business, operating concessions at New York's Fort George Amusement Park. Recognizing the potential, in 1909 the Schenck brothers purchased Palisades Amusement Park and afterward became participants in the fledgling motion picture industry in partnership with Marcus Loew, operating a chain of movie theaters.

In 1916, through his involvement in the film business, Joseph Schenck met and married Norma Talmadge, a top young star with Vitagraph Studios. He would be the first of her three husbands, but she was his only wife. Schenck supervised, controlled and nurtured her career in alliance with her mother. In 1917 the couple formed the Norma Talmadge Film Corporation, which became a lucrative enterprise. They divorced in 1934; Schenck then built a home in Palm Springs, California.

After parting ways with his brother, Joseph Schenck moved to the West Coast where the future of the film industry seemed to lie. Within a few years Schenck was made the second president of the new United Artists.

The Political Graveyard reports that he was an alternate delegate from California to the 1928 Republican National Convention.

In 1933 he partnered with Darryl F. Zanuck to form Twentieth Century Pictures to produce motion pictures for United Artists, until 20th Century merged with Fox Film in 1935. As chairman of the new 20th Century Fox, he was one of the most powerful and influential people in the film business. Caught in a payoff scheme to buy peace with the militant unions, he was convicted of income tax evasion and spent time in prison before being granted a presidential pardon. Following his release, he returned to 20th Century Fox where he became infatuated with the unknown Marilyn Monroe, and played a key role in launching her career.

Honors
One of the founders of the Academy of Motion Picture Arts and Sciences, in 1952 he was given a special Academy Award in recognition of his contribution to the development of the film industry. He has a star on the Hollywood Walk of Fame at 6757 Hollywood Blvd.

Death
Schenck retired in 1957 and shortly afterward suffered a stroke, from which he never fully recovered. He died in Los Angeles in 1961 at the age of 84, and was interred in Maimonides Cemetery in Brooklyn, New York.

References

External links

 

1876 births
1961 deaths
American film studio executives
Twentieth Century Pictures
20th Century Studios people
Academy of Motion Picture Arts and Sciences founders
Academy Honorary Award recipients
American amusement park businesspeople
American businesspeople convicted of crimes
American chief executives
American people convicted of tax crimes
American Jews
American people of Russian-Jewish descent
Businesspeople from Los Angeles
Emigrants from the Russian Empire to the United States
Businesspeople from Palm Springs, California
People from Rybinsk
Jews from the Russian Empire
California Republicans
United Artists
American film production company founders
Film producers from California
Deaths from cerebrovascular disease